Cambridge Prep Academy is a school that goes from kindergarten to twelfth grade. It is located in Lake City, Florida, in the downtown area.

The school uses Florida Virtual School (FLVS) along with teachers in classes.

References

External links

Schools in Florida